Veysəlli or Veysanli or Veysalli or Veysally or Veysəili may refer to:
Aşağı Veysəlli, Azerbaijan
Daş Veysəlli, Azerbaijan
Göyərçin Veysəlli, Azerbaijan
Veysəlli, Goychay, Azerbaijan
Yuxarı Veysəlli, Azerbaijan

See also

Veyselli, Erdemli, Mersin Province, Turkey